Ponson-Dessus is a commune in the Pyrénées-Atlantiques department in south-western France.

Neighboring communes are Ponson-Debat-Pouts to the north, Oroix (in Hautes-Pyrénées) to the east, Séron (also in Hautes-Pyrénées) and Aast to the west, and Ger to the south.

The inhabitants are called ponsonais(e).

See also
Communes of the Pyrénées-Atlantiques department

References

Communes of Pyrénées-Atlantiques
Pyrénées-Atlantiques communes articles needing translation from French Wikipedia